Colias stoliczkana, the orange clouded yellow, is a small butterfly of the family Pieridae, that is, the yellows and whites, that is found in India.

See also
Pieridae
List of butterflies of India
List of butterflies of India (Pieridae)

References
 
 

stoliczkana
Butterflies of Asia
Butterflies described in 1882
Taxa named by Frederic Moore